USNS Andrew J. Higgins (T-AO-190) was a  oiler of the United States Navy which saw active service from 1987 to 1996. Sold to Chile in 2009, she was commissioned as Almirante Montt in the Chilean Navy in 2010.

Construction
Andrew J. Higgins, the fourth ship of the Henry J. Kaiser class, was laid down at Avondale Shipyard, Inc., at New Orleans, Louisiana, on 21 November 1985 and launched on 17 January 1987. She was named for Andrew Higgins, the man credited with developing the landing craft, vehicle, personnel (LCVP), or "Higgins Boat", of World War II.

Service history

U.S. Navy
Andrew J. Higgins entered non-commissioned U.S. Navy service under Military Sealift Command control with a primarily civilian crew on 22 October 1987. She was taken out of active service on 6 May 1996 and placed in reserve in the National Defense Reserve Fleet in Suisun Bay at Benicia, California, where she remained until September 2009. She was the first ship of her class to be taken out of service.

In 2008, Andrew J. Higgins was selected for transfer to Chile as a Foreign Assistance Act grant. She was stricken from the Naval Vessel Register on 6 January 2009 and sold to Chile on 19 May 2009. She was withdrawn from the Reserve Fleet at Suisun Bay on 24 September 2009 and towed to the Atlantic Marine Alabama shipyard at Mobile, Alabama, to undergo a three-month refit and overhaul.

Chilean Navy

Renamed Almirante Montt with the identification number AO-52, the oiler was commissioned in the Chilean Navy on 10 February 2010, replacing the oiler Araucano.

In an effort to address the Royal Canadian Navy's at-sea support services capability gap until the arrival of its new  supply ships, Canada signed a Mutual Logistic Support Arrangement with Chile in 2015. Almirante Montt returned to Canada in 2016, operating with the Royal Canadian Navy from April to June 2016.

References
Citations'

References

External links

 "Service Ship Photo Archive: T-AO-190 Andrew J. Higgins", NavSource Online
 USNS Andrew J. Higgins (T-AO 190)
 Sealift, U.S. Navy's Military Sealift Command: Chilean navy embarks on MSC oiler

 

Henry J. Kaiser-class oilers
Cold War auxiliary ships of the United States
Ships built in New Orleans
1987 ships
Ships transferred from the United States Navy to the Chilean Navy
Auxiliary ships of the Chilean Navy